This is a list of Hungarian monarchs, that includes the grand princes (895–1000) and the kings and ruling queens of Hungary (1000–1918).

The Principality of Hungary established around 895, following the 9th-century Hungarian conquest of the Carpathian Basin. The Kingdom of Hungary existed from 1000–1001 with the coronation of King Saint Stephen. The Árpád dynasty, the male-line descendants of Grand Prince Árpád, ruled Hungary continuously from 895 to 1301. Christianity was adopted as the state religion for the Kingdom of Hungary by King Saint Stephen and the kings of the Árpád dynasty used the title of the apostolic king. The descendants of the dynasty gave the world the highest number of saints and blesseds from one family. Therefore, since the 13th century the dynasty has often been referred to as the "Kindred of the Holy Kings". The Árpád dynasty ruled the Carpathian Basin for four hundred years, influencing almost all of Europe through its extensive dynastic connections. The paternal lineage of the Árpád dynasty came to end in 1301 with the death of King Andrew III of Hungary, and all of the subsequent kings of Hungary (with the exception of King Matthias Corvinus) were cognatic descendants of the Árpád dynasty. After World War I in 1918, King Charles IV "renounced participation" in state affairs, but did not abdicate. The Kingdom of Hungary existed as a country from 1920 to 1946, officially represented the Hungarian monarchy, but in reality there was no king.

Semi-legendary rulers before the Conquest

Grand Princes of Hungary

House of Árpád

The king-list for the first half of the 10th century is often disputed, as the Hungarian nation consisted of several tribes led by various leaders. The most frequently proposed list is:

Kings of Hungary

House of Přemyslid (1301–1305)

House of Wittelsbach (1305–1307)

House of Anjou (1308–1395)

House of Luxembourg (1387–1437)

House of Habsburg (1437–1457)

 27 October 1439 – 19 December 1442: Queen Regent Elizabeth of Luxembourg
 7 May 1445 – 6 June 1446: Seven Captains of the Realm
 6 June 1446 – January 1453: Regent John Hunyadi

House of Jagiellon (1440–1444)

House of Hunyadi (1458–1490)

House of Jagiellon (1490–1526)

House of Zápolya (1526–1570)

House of Habsburg (1526–1780)

House of Habsburg-Lorraine (1780–1918)

Timeline

See also

 Family tree of Hungarian monarchs
 List of princes of Transylvania
 List of palatines of Hungary
 List of heads of state of Hungary
 List of prime ministers of Hungary

References

External links
Rulers and Heads of State of Hungary
Hungarian Dynasties

Hungary, Rulers
 List
 
Monarchs